The East Pascagoula River Light was a lighthouse in Pascagoula, Mississippi. A house with a lantern on top, it was first lit in 1854 but was extinguished in the Civil War and was not relit until 1868. It was destroyed in the 1906 Mississippi hurricane and was never rebuilt.

References

Lighthouses in Mississippi
Lighthouses completed in 1854
1854 establishments in Mississippi
Buildings and structures demolished in 1906
Pascagoula, Mississippi
Buildings and structures in Jackson County, Mississippi